Adelio Dell'Oro is the Italian-born Catholic Bishop of Karaganda, Kazakhstan.

Biography

Early life and education 

Born on 31 July 1948 in Milan, Italy. His first cousin is Italo Dell'Oro, who is now an Auxilary Bishop in the Archdiocese of Galveston-Houston. In 1959 he entered the minor seminary in Milan. In 1967 he went to complete his classical studies at the Northern Italian theological faculties.

Ministry 
He was ordained a priest for the Archdiocese of Milan by Cardinal Giovanni Colombo on 28 June 1972. He served as the Vicar of St Andrea's Parish in Milan until 1983. He then served as the Vicar of St Maria Assunta parish in Buccinasco until 1997. Meanwhile, Dell'Oro was a teacher of the religion in secondary schools and technical institutes from 1974 to 1997.

Initial Service in Kazakhstan 

In 1997, he was transferred to Kazakhstan where he became the director of the Kazakhstani branch of Caritas from 1997 to 2007. He also served as a priest at Vishniovka-Ashaly, collaborator of the apostolic nunciature and teacher of theology at the major seminary of Karaganda from 2007 to 2009. He became the spiritual director of the inter-diocesan Mary the Mother of the Church seminary in Karaganda.

Return to Italy

In 2009, he returned to Italy where he served the Parish of San Zeno in Cambiago. He was appointed vice-rector of the college at Guastalla Monza and Diocesan Assistant of Communion and Liberation from 2010 to 2012.

Appointment as Bishop and Return to Kazakhstan 

On the Solemnity of St Ambrose, 7 December 2012, Pope Benedict XVI appointed Dell'Oro Apostolic Administrator of Atyrau, Kazakhstan (upon the resignation of Bishop Janusz Wiesław Kaleta) and Titular Bishop of Castulo.

He received his episcopal ordination on 2 March 2013 in the cathedral of Milan by the hands of Cardinal Angelo Scola, Archbishop of Milan with Cardinal Dionigi Tettamanzi, Archbishop Emeritus of Milan, and Archbishop Tomasz Peta of Astana as co-consecrators. He arrived in Atyrau on 21 April.

On 31 January 2015, Dell'Oro was appointed Bishop of Karaganda by Pope Francis although he remained as Apostolic Administrator of Atyrau until 16 May.

Languages Spoken 

In addition to his native Italian Dell'Oro speaks Russian and English. He also has a working knowledge of Latin and Kazakh.

References

External links

1948 births
Kazakhstani Roman Catholic bishops
Catholic Church in Kazakhstan
21st-century Italian Roman Catholic bishops
Living people